Chen Chin-hsing (born 24 December 1934) is a Taiwanese lawyer and politician.

Chen studied law at National Taiwan University and worked as a schoolteacher and lawyer prior to the start of his political career. As a member of the Kuomintang, he served two terms as Hsinchu County Magistrate from 1981 to 1989. Chen then spent the next decade with the Taiwan Provincial Government. He supported James Soong's 2000 presidential campaign, and later served one term in the Legislative Yuan affiliated with the People First Party. While representing his native Hsinchu County district, Chen worked to pass the Unauthorized Filming Prevention Law to regulate the use of hidden cameras.

Chen is of Hakka descent.

References

1934 births
Living people
Taiwanese schoolteachers
20th-century Taiwanese judges
National Taiwan University alumni
People First Party Members of the Legislative Yuan
Members of the 5th Legislative Yuan
Hsinchu County Members of the Legislative Yuan
Magistrates of Hsinchu County
Taiwanese politicians of Hakka descent
20th-century Taiwanese educators